Nuria Domínguez Asensio (born 30 January 1974 in Toronto, Ontario) is a female competition rower from Spain, who was born in Canada. A bronze medal winner at the 2005 Mediterranean Games she represented Spain at three Summer Olympics: 1996, 2004 and 2008.

References
sports-reference

1974 births
Living people
Canadian female rowers
Olympic rowers of Spain
Rowers from Toronto
Rowers at the 1996 Summer Olympics
Rowers at the 2004 Summer Olympics
Rowers at the 2008 Summer Olympics
Canadian people of Spanish descent
Spanish people of Canadian descent
Spanish female rowers

Mediterranean Games bronze medalists for Spain
Competitors at the 2005 Mediterranean Games
Mediterranean Games medalists in rowing